Barbara Slater (December 17, 1920 – October 14, 1997) was an American film actress. She appeared in over 20 films between 1941 and 1947.

Early years 
Slater's father was Edward Slater, who was described in a 1942 newspaper article as a "celebrated painter", and her mother was an actress. Slater's education came in Switzerland.

Career 
Slater initially had a contract with Paramount, but she received her release after a year and began working for other studios.

Modern viewers will recognize Slater for her roles in two Three Stooges films from the 1940s. She was the rumba dancing partner of Curly Howard in Three Smart Saps. Standing nearly six feet tall, Slater towers over the short Stooge, and then manages to tear off his trousers, thanks to the pants being loosely basted. Slater also appeared as Lulu Quackenbush in Half-Wits Holiday, with Curly eating her lipstick, thinking it is edible. Thanks to the popularity of the Stooges, Slater is seen almost daily worldwide due to the films' constant television broadcasts. 

Slater also appears in Charlie Chaplin's Monsieur Verdoux, as the florist who eavesdrops on Monsieur Verdoux's telephone seduction of his next intended victim.

In addition to her film work, Slater was a model at the John Robert Powers Agency in the early 1940s.

Personal life 
Slater left Hollywood in 1947, and married character actor Robert Foulk on July 3 of that year. They were married until his death in 1989. Slater was later married to Charles Sims until her death on October 14, 1997.

References

External links

1920 births
1997 deaths
American film actresses
20th-century American actresses